Adventure Wonderland is a family theme park situated in the village of Hurn, near Bournemouth, United Kingdom. The park offers rides and attractions aimed at families with children up to the age of 10. It draws much of its theme from the novel Alice in Wonderland by Lewis Carroll and Alice, The Mad Hatter, the Queen of Hearts, The Cheshire Cat, and The White Rabbit make appearances throughout the day around the park and in the theatre shows.

Adventure Wonderland also incorporates the aztec adventure play centre Wild Thing which opens as part of the full park during the summer or individually during the winter months.

The park also hosts a number of special character day events as well as seasonal Halloween and Christmas themed events.

Hedge maze
The park includes an octagonal,  beech hedge maze (5,200 bushes) designed by Adrian Fisher (1991). The maze has 1.75 miles of paths. It is claimed to be the third largest maze in the UK. The Maze uses a 'left turn' route to complete.

References

Amusement parks in England
Mazes in the United Kingdom
Tourist attractions in Dorset
1992 establishments in England
2009 establishments in England